was a railway station in Miki, Hyōgo Prefecture, Japan.

Lines
Miki Railway
Miki Line - Abandoned on April 1, 2008

Adjacent stations

Miki Railway Memorial Park 

In June 2010, the former station building and the adjacent area were converted to a community facility named Miki Railway Memorial Park.

References 

Railway stations in Hyōgo Prefecture
Defunct railway stations in Japan
Railway stations closed in 2008